Ganesha, also known as Ganapati, Vinayaka, and Pillaiyar, is one of the best-known and most worshipped deities in the Hindu pantheon and is the Supreme God in Ganapatya sect. His image is found throughout India. Hindu denominations worship him regardless of affiliations. Devotion to Ganesha is widely diffused and extends to Jains and Buddhists and includes Nepal, Bangladesh, Sri Lanka, Indonesia, Thailand, Myanmar, China, and Japan and in countries with large ethnic Hindus populations including United States, Fiji, Guyana, Mauritius, and Trinidad and Tobago.

Although Ganesha has many attributes, he is readily identified by his elephant head. He is widely revered, more specifically, as the remover of obstacles and thought to bring good luck; the patron of arts and sciences; and the deva of intellect and wisdom. As the god of beginnings, he is honoured at the start of rites and ceremonies. Ganesha is also invoked as a patron of letters and learning during writing sessions. Several texts relate mythological anecdotes associated with his birth and exploits.

While scholars differ about his origins dating him between 1st century BCE and 2nd century CE, Ganesha was well established by the 4th and 5th centuries CE, during the Gupta period and had inherited traits from Vedic and pre-Vedic precursors. Hindu mythology identifies him as the son of Parvati and Shiva of the Shaivism tradition, but he is a pan-Hindu god found in its various traditions. In the Ganapatya tradition of Hinduism, Ganesha is the Supreme Being. The principal texts on Ganesha include the Ganesha Purana, the Mudgala Purana and the Ganapati Atharvasirsha.

Etymology and other names

Ganesha has been ascribed many other titles and epithets, including Ganapati (Ganpati), Vighneshvara, and Pillaiyar. The Hindu title of respect Shri (also spelled Sri or Shree) is often added before his name.

The name Ganesha is a Sanskrit compound, joining the words gana, meaning a 'group, multitude, or categorical system' and isha, meaning 'lord or master'. The word gaṇa when associated with Ganesha is often taken to refer to the gaṇas, a troop of semi-divine beings that form part of the retinue of Shiva, Ganesha's father. The term more generally means a category, class, community, association, or corporation. Some commentators interpret the name "Lord of the " to mean "Lord of Hosts" or "Lord of created categories", such as the elements. Though the earliest mention of the word Ganapati is found in hymn 2.23.1 of the 2nd-millennium BCE Rigveda, it is however uncertain that the Vedic term referred specifically to Ganesha. The Amarakosha, an early Sanskrit lexicon, lists eight synonyms of Ganesha: Vinayaka,  (equivalent to Vighnesha),  (one who has two mothers),  (equivalent to Ganapati and Ganesha), Ekadanta (one who has one tusk), Heramba, Lambodara (one who has a pot belly, or, literally, one who has a hanging belly), and Gajanana; having the face of an elephant.

Vinayaka or Binayaka is a common name for Ganesha that appears in the s and in Buddhist Tantras. This name is reflected in the naming of the eight famous Ganesha temples in Maharashtra known as the Ashtavinayak. The names Vighnesha and Vighneshvara (Lord of Obstacles) refers to his primary function in Hinduism as the master and remover of obstacles.

A prominent name for Ganesha in the Tamil language is Pillai or Pillaiyar. A.K. Narain differentiates these terms by saying that pillai means a "child" while pillaiyar means a "noble child". He adds that the words pallu, pella, and pell in the Dravidian family of languages signify "tooth or tusk", also "elephant tooth or tusk". Anita Raina Thapan notes that the root word pille in the name Pillaiyar might have originally meant "the young of the elephant", because the Pali word pillaka means "a young elephant".

In the Burmese language, Ganesha is known as Maha Peinne, derived from Pali . The widespread name of Ganesha in Thailand is Phra Phikanet. The earliest images and mention of Ganesha names as a major deity in present-day Indonesia, Thailand, Cambodia and Vietnam date from the 7th and 8th centuries, and these mirror Indian examples of the 5th century or earlier. In Sri Lankan Singhala Buddhist areas, he is known as Gana deviyo, and revered along with Buddha, Vishnu, Skanda and others.

Iconography 

Ganesha is a popular figure in Indian art. Unlike those of some deities, representations of Ganesha show wide variations and distinct patterns changing over time. He may be portrayed standing, dancing, heroically taking action against demons, playing with his family as a boy, sitting down on an elevated seat, or engaging in a range of contemporary situations.

Ganesha images were prevalent in many parts of India by the 6th century CE. The 13th-century statue pictured is typical of Ganesha statuary from 900 to 1200, after Ganesha had been well-established as an independent deity with his own sect. This example features some of Ganesha's common iconographic elements. A virtually identical statue has been dated between 973 and 1200 by Paul Martin-Dubost, and another similar statue is dated c. 12th century by Pratapaditya Pal. Ganesha has the head of an elephant and a big belly. This statue has four arms, which is common in depictions of Ganesha. He holds his own broken tusk in his lower-right hand and holds a delicacy, which he samples with his trunk, in his lower-left hand. The motif of Ganesha turning his trunk sharply to his left to taste a sweet in his lower-left hand is a particularly archaic feature. A more primitive statue in one of the Ellora Caves with this general form has been dated to the 7th century. Details of the other hands are difficult to make out on the statue shown. In the standard configuration, Ganesha typically holds an axe or a goad in one upper arm and a pasha (noose) in the other upper arm. In rare instances, he may be depicted with a human head.

The influence of this old constellation of iconographic elements can still be seen in contemporary representations of Ganesha. In one modern form, the only variation from these old elements is that the lower-right hand does not hold the broken tusk but is turned towards the viewer in a gesture of protection or fearlessness (Abhaya mudra). The same combination of four arms and attributes occurs in statues of Ganesha dancing, which is a very popular theme.

Common attributes 

Ganesha has been represented with the head of an elephant since the early stages of his appearance in Indian art. Puranic myths provide many explanations for how he got his elephant head. One of his popular forms, Heramba-Ganapati, has five elephant heads, and other less-common variations in the number of heads are known. While some texts say that Ganesha was born with an elephant head, he acquires the head later in most stories. The most recurrent motif in these stories is that Ganesha was created by Parvati using clay to protect her and Shiva beheaded him when Ganesha came between Shiva and Parvati. Shiva then replaced Ganesha's original head with that of an elephant. Details of the battle and where the replacement head came from vary from source to source. Another story says that Ganesha was created directly by Shiva's laughter. Because Shiva considered Ganesha too alluring, he gave him the head of an elephant and a protruding belly.

Ganesha's earliest name was Ekadanta (One Tusked), referring to his single whole tusk, the other being broken. Some of the earliest images of Ganesha show him holding his broken tusk. The importance of this distinctive feature is reflected in the Mudgala Purana, which states that the name of Ganesha's second incarnation is Ekadanta. Ganesha's protruding belly appears as a distinctive attribute in his earliest statuary, which dates to the Gupta period (4th to 6th centuries). This feature is so important that according to the Mudgala Purana, two different incarnations of Ganesha use names based on it: Lambodara (Pot Belly, or, literally, Hanging Belly) and Mahodara (Great Belly). Both names are Sanskrit compounds describing his belly. The Brahmanda Purana says that Ganesha has the name Lambodara because all the universes (i.e., cosmic eggs;) of the past, present, and future are present in him.

The number of Ganesha's arms varies; his best-known forms have between two and sixteen arms. Many depictions of Ganesha feature four arms, which is mentioned in Puranic sources and codified as a standard form in some iconographic texts. His earliest images had two arms. Forms with 14 and 20 arms appeared in Central India during the 9th and the 10th centuries. The serpent is a common feature in Ganesha iconography and appears in many forms. According to the Ganesha Purana, Ganesha wrapped the serpent Vasuki around his neck. Other depictions of snakes include use as a sacred thread wrapped around the stomach as a belt, held in a hand, coiled at the ankles, or as a throne. Upon Ganesha's forehead may be a third eye or the sectarian mark, which consists of three horizontal lines. The Ganesha Purana prescribes a tilaka mark as well as a crescent moon on the forehead. A distinct form of Ganesha called Bhalachandra ("Moon on the Forehead") includes that iconographic element.

Ganesha is often described as red in colour. Specific colours are associated with certain forms. Many examples of color associations with specific meditation forms are prescribed in the Sritattvanidhi, a treatise on Hindu iconography. For example, white is associated with his representations as Heramba-Ganapati and Rina-Mochana-Ganapati (Ganapati Who Releases from Bondage). Ekadanta-Ganapati is visualised as blue during meditation in that form.

Vahanas 

The earliest Ganesha images are without a vahana (mount/vehicle). Of the eight incarnations of Ganesha described in the Mudgala Purana, Ganesha uses a mouse (shrew) in five of them, a lion in his incarnation as Vakratunda, a peacock in his incarnation as Vikata, and Shesha, the divine serpent, in his incarnation as Vighnaraja. Mohotkata uses a lion,  uses a peacock, Dhumraketu uses a horse, and Gajanana uses a mouse, in the four incarnations of Ganesha listed in the Ganesha Purana. Jain depictions of Ganesha show his vahana variously as a mouse, elephant, tortoise, ram, or peacock.

Ganesha is often shown riding on or attended by a mouse, shrew or rat. Martin-Dubost says that the rat began to appear as the principal vehicle in sculptures of Ganesha in central and western India during the 7th century; the rat was always placed close to his feet. The mouse as a mount first appears in written sources in the Matsya Purana and later in the Brahmananda Purana and Ganesha Purana, where Ganesha uses it as his vehicle in his last incarnation. The Ganapati Atharvashirsa includes a meditation verse on Ganesha that describes the mouse appearing on his flag.

The mouse is interpreted in several ways. According to Grimes, "Many, if not most of those who interpret 's mouse, do so negatively; it symbolizes  as well as desire". Along these lines, Michael Wilcockson says it symbolises those who wish to overcome desires and be less selfish. Krishan notes that the rat is destructive and a menace to crops. The Sanskrit word  (mouse) is derived from the root  (stealing, robbing). It was essential to subdue the rat as a destructive pest, a type of vighna (impediment) that needed to be overcome. According to this theory, showing Ganesha as master of the rat demonstrates his function as Vigneshvara (Lord of Obstacles) and gives evidence of his possible role as a folk grāma-devatā (village deity) who later rose to greater prominence. Martin-Dubost notes a view that the rat is a symbol suggesting that Ganesha, like the rat, penetrates even the most secret places.

Features

Removal of obstacles 
Ganesha is Vighneshvara (Vighnaraja, Marathi – Vighnaharta), the Lord of Obstacles, both of a material and spiritual order. He is popularly worshipped as a remover of obstacles, though traditionally he also places obstacles in the path of those who need to be checked. Hence, he is often worshipped by the people before they begin anything new. Paul Courtright says that Ganesha's dharma and his raison d'être is to create and remove obstacles.

Krishan notes that some of Ganesha's names reflect shadings of multiple roles that have evolved over time. However, both functions continue to be vital to his character.

Buddhi (Intelligence) 
Ganesha is considered to be the Lord of letters and learning. In Sanskrit, the word buddhi is an active noun that is variously translated as intelligence, wisdom, or intellect. The concept of buddhi is closely associated with the personality of Ganesha, especially in the Puranic period, when many stories stress his cleverness and love of intelligence. One of Ganesha's names in the Ganesha Purana and the Ganesha Sahasranama is Buddhipriya. This name also appears in a list of 21 names at the end of the Ganesha Sahasranama that Ganesha says are especially important. The word priya can mean "fond of", and in a marital context it can mean "lover" or "husband", so the name may mean either "Fond of Intelligence" or "Buddhi's Husband".

Om 

Ganesha is identified with the Hindu mantra Om. The term  (Om is his form), when identified with Ganesha, refers to the notion that he personifies the primal sound. The Ganapati Atharvashirsa attests to this association. Chinmayananda translates the relevant passage as follows:

Some devotees see similarities between the shape of Ganesha's body in iconography and the shape of Om in the Devanāgarī and Tamil scripts.

First chakra 
According to Kundalini yoga, Ganesha resides in the first chakra, called Muladhara. Mula means "original, main"; adhara means "base, foundation". The muladhara chakra is the principle on which the manifestation or outward expansion of primordial Divine Force rests. This association is also attested to in the Ganapati Atharvashirsa. Courtright translates this passage as follows: "You continually dwell in the sacral plexus at the base of the spine []." Thus, Ganesha has a permanent abode in every being at the Muladhara. Ganesha holds, supports and guides all other chakras, thereby "governing the forces that propel the wheel of life".

Family and consorts 

Though Ganesha is popularly held to be the son of Shiva and Parvati, the Puranic texts give different versions about his birth. In some he was created by Parvati, or by Shiva or created by Shiva and Parvati, in another he appeared mysteriously and was discovered by Shiva and Parvati or he was born from the elephant headed goddess Malini after she drank Parvati's bath water that had been thrown in the river.

The family includes his brother, the god of war, Kartikeya, who is also called Skanda and Murugan. Regional differences dictate the order of their births. In northern India, Skanda is generally said to be the elder, while in the south, Ganesha is considered the firstborn. In northern India, Skanda was an important martial deity from about 500 BCE to about 600 CE, after which worship of him declined significantly. As Skanda fell, Ganesha rose. Several stories tell of sibling rivalry between the brothers and may reflect sectarian tensions.

Ganesha's marital status, the subject of considerable scholarly review, varies widely in mythological stories. One pattern of myths identifies Ganesha as an unmarried brahmachari. This view is common in southern India and parts of northern India. Another popularly-accepted mainstream pattern associates him with the concepts of Buddhi (intellect), Siddhi (spiritual power), and Riddhi (prosperity); these qualities are personified as goddesses, said to be Ganesha's wives. He also may be shown with a single consort or a nameless servant. He is also associated with the goddess of luck and prosperity, Lakshmi. Another pattern, mainly prevalent in the Bengal region, links Ganesha with the banana tree, Kala Bo.

The 1975 Hindi film Jai Santoshi Maa shows Ganesha married to Riddhi and Siddhi and having a daughter named Santoshi Ma, the goddess of satisfaction. This story has no Puranic basis, but Anita Raina Thapan and Lawrence Cohen cite Santoshi Ma's cult as evidence of Ganesha's continuing evolution as a popular deity.

Worship and festivals 

Ganesha is worshipped on many religious and secular occasions, especially at the beginning of ventures such as buying a vehicle or starting a business. K.N Soumyaji says, "there can hardly be a [Hindu] home [in India] which does not house an idol of Ganapati. ... Ganapati, being the most popular deity in India, is worshipped by almost all castes and in all parts of the country". Devotees believe that if Ganesha is propitiated, he grants success, prosperity and protection against adversity.

Ganesha is a non-sectarian deity. Hindus of all denominations invoke him at the beginning of prayers, important undertakings, and religious ceremonies. Dancers and musicians, particularly in southern India, begin art performances such as the Bharatanatyam dance with a prayer to Ganesha. Mantras such as Om Shri  Namah (Om, salutation to the Illustrious Ganesha) are often used. One of the most famous mantras associated with Ganesha is Om  Ganapataye Namah (Om, Salutation to the Lord of Hosts).

Devotees offer Ganesha sweets such as modaka and small sweet balls called laddus. Because of his identification with the color red, he is often worshipped with red sandalwood paste or red flowers.  grass (Cynodon dactylon) and other materials are also used in his worship.

Ganesha Chaturthi

An annual festival honours Ganesha for ten days, starting on Ganesha Chaturthi, which typically falls in late August or early September. The festival begins with people bringing in clay idols of Ganesha, symbolising the god's visit. The festival culminates on the day of Ananta Chaturdashi, when the idols (murtis) are immersed in the most convenient body of water.  Some families have a tradition of immersion on the 2nd, 3rd, 5th, or 7th day. In 1893, Lokmanya Tilak transformed this annual Ganesha festival from private family celebrations into a grand public event. He did so "to bridge the gap between the Brahmins and the non-Brahmins and find an appropriate context in which to build a new grassroots unity between them" in his nationalistic strivings against the British in Maharashtra. Because of Ganesha's wide appeal as "the god for Everyman", Tilak chose him as a rallying point for Indian protest against British rule. Tilak was the first to install large public images of Ganesha in pavilions, and he established the practice of submerging all the public images on the tenth day.
Today, Hindus across India celebrate the Ganapati festival with great fervour, though it is most popular in the state of Maharashtra. The festival also assumes huge proportions in Mumbai, Pune, and in the surrounding belt of Ashtavinayaka temples.

Temples 

In Hindu temples, Ganesha is depicted in various ways: as a subordinate deity; as a deity related to the principal deity; or as the principal deity of the temple. As the god of transitions, he is placed at the doorway of many Hindu temples to keep out the unworthy, which is analogous to his role as Parvati's doorkeeper. In addition, several shrines are dedicated to Ganesha himself, of which the Ashtavinayak (Sanskrit: अष्टविनायक; ; lit. "eight Ganesha (shrines)") in Maharashtra are particularly well known. Located within a 100-kilometer radius of the city of Pune, each of the eight shrines celebrates a particular form of Ganapati, complete with its own lore. The eight shrines are: Morgaon, Siddhatek, Pali, Mahad, Theur, Lenyadri, Ozar and Ranjangaon.

There are many other important Ganesha temples at the following locations: Siddhivinayak temple in Mumbai, Ganpatipule temple at Ganpatipule, Binkhambi Ganesh mandir in Kolhapur, Jai Vinayak temple in Jaigad, Ratnagiri, Wai in Maharashtra; Ujjain in Madhya Pradesh; Jodhpur, Nagaur and Raipur (Pali) in Rajasthan; Baidyanath in Bihar; Baroda, Dholaka, and Valsad in Gujarat and Dhundiraj Temple in Varanasi, Uttar Pradesh. Prominent Ganesha temples in southern India include the following: Kanipakam in Andhra Pradesh; the Rockfort Ucchi Pillayar Temple at Tiruchirapalli, Puliakulam Munthi Vinayagar Temple at Coimbatore and Karpaga Vinayagar Temple in Pillaiyarpatti which is a town named after Ganesha in Tamil Nadu; Kottarakkara, Pazhavangadi, Kasargod in Kerala; Hampi, and Idagunji in Karnataka; and Bhadrachalam in Telangana.

Ganesha temples have also been built outside of India, including Southeast Asia, Nepal (including the four Vinayaka shrines in the Kathmandu Valley), and in several western countries.

Rise to prominence

First appearance 

An elephant–headed anthropomorphic figure on Indo-Greek coins from the 1st century BCE has been proposed by some scholars to be "incipient Ganesha", while others have suggested Ganesha may have been an emerging deity in India and southeast Asia around the 2nd century CE based on the evidence from archaeological excavations in Mathura and outside India. First terracotta images of Ganesha are from 1st century CE found in Ter, Pal, Verrapuram, and Chandraketugarh. These figures are small, with an elephant head, two arms, and chubby physique. The earliest Ganesha icons in stone were carved in Mathura during Kushan times (2nd–3rd centuries CE).

Ganesha appeared in his classic form as a clearly-recognizable deity with well-defined iconographic attributes in the early 4th to 5th centuries CE. Some of the earliest known Ganesha images include two images found in eastern Afghanistan. The first image was discovered in the ruins north of Kabul along with those of Surya and Shiva. It is dated to the 4th century. The second image found in Gardez, the Gardez Ganesha, has an inscription on Ganesha pedestal that has helped date it to the 5th century. Another Ganesha sculpture is embedded in the walls of Cave 6 of the Udayagiri Caves in Madhya Pradesh. This is dated to the 5th century. An early iconic image of Ganesha with elephant head, a bowl of sweets and a goddess sitting in his lap has been found in the ruins of the Bhumara Temple in Madhya Pradesh, and this is dated to the 5th-century Gupta period. Other recent discoveries, such as one from Ramgarh Hill, are also dated to the 4th or 5th century. An independent cult with Ganesha as the primary deity was well established by about the 10th century. Narain summarises the lack of evidence about Ganesha's history before the 5th century as follows:

The evidence for more ancient Ganesha, suggests Narain, may reside outside Brahmanic or Sanskritic traditions, or outside geocultural boundaries of India. Ganesha appears in China by the 6th century, states Brown, and his artistic images in temple setting as "remover of obstacles" in South Asia appear by about 400 CE. He is, states Bailey, recognised as goddess Parvati's son and integrated into Shaivism theology by early centuries of the common era.

Possible influences 

Courtright reviews various speculative theories about the early history of Ganesha, including supposed tribal traditions and animal cults, and dismisses all of them in this way:

Thapan's book on the development of Ganesha devotes a chapter to speculations about the role elephants had in early India but concludes that "although by the second century CE the elephant-headed  form exists it cannot be presumed to represent . There is no evidence of a deity by this name having an elephant or elephant-headed form at this early stage.  had yet to make his debut."

The Pashupati seal (c. 2300 BCE - 2000 BCE) depicts 4 animals including an elephant around a deity who is claimed by some to be Shiva. Brown notes that this seal indicates the sacredness of elephants before Vedic period. One theory of the origin of Ganesha is that he gradually came to prominence in connection with the four Vinayakas. Krishan is one of the academics who accept this view, stating flatly of Ganesha, "He is a non-Vedic god. His origin is to be traced to the four Vināyakas, evil spirits, of the Mānavagŗhyasūtra (7th–4th century BCE) who cause various types of evil and suffering". Depictions of elephant-headed human figures, which some identify with Ganesha, appear in Indian art and coinage as early as the 2nd century. According to Ellawala, the elephant-headed Ganesha as lord of the Ganas was known to the people of Sri Lanka in the early pre-Christian era.

Vedic and epic literature 

The title "Leader of the group" occurs twice in the Rig Veda, but in neither case does it refer to the modern Ganesha. The term appears in RV 2.23.1 as a title for Brahmanaspati, according to commentators. While this verse doubtless refers to Brahmanaspati, it was later adopted for worship of Ganesha and is still used today. In rejecting any claim that this passage is evidence of Ganesha in the Rig Veda, Ludo Rocher says that it "clearly refers to —who is the deity of the hymn—and  only". Equally clearly, the second passage (RV 10.112.9) refers to Indra, who is given the epithet '', translated "Lord of the companies (of the Maruts)." However, Rocher notes that the more recent Ganapatya literature often quotes the Rigvedic verses to give Vedic respectability to Ganesha.

The Sangam period Tamil poet Avvaiyar (3rd century BCE), invokes Ganesha while preparing the invitation to the three Tamil Kingdoms for giving away in marriage of Angavay and Sangavay of Ceylon in marriage to the King of Tirucovalur (pp. 57–59).

Two verses in texts belonging to Black Yajurveda,    (2.9.1) and  (10.1), appeal to a deity as "the tusked one", "elephant-faced" (Hastimukha), and "with a curved trunk". These names are suggestive of Ganesha, and the 14th century commentator Sayana explicitly establishes this identification. The description of Dantin, possessing a twisted trunk and holding a corn-sheaf, a sugar cane, and a club, is so characteristic of the Puranic Ganapati that Heras says "we cannot resist to accept his full identification with this Vedic Dantin". However, Krishan considers these hymns to be post-Vedic additions. Thapan reports that these passages are "generally considered to have been interpolated". Dhavalikar says, "the references to the elephant-headed deity in the  have been proven to be very late interpolations, and thus are not very helpful for determining the early formation of the deity".

Ganesha does not appear in the Indian epic literature that is dated to the Vedic period. A late interpolation to the epic poem Mahabharata (1.1.75–79) says that the sage Vyasa asked Ganesha to serve as his scribe to transcribe the poem as he dictated it to him. Ganesha agreed but only on the condition that Vyasa recites the poem uninterrupted, that is, without pausing. The sage agreed but found that to get any rest he needed to recite very complex passages so Ganesha would have to ask for clarifications. The story is not accepted as part of the original text by the editors of the critical edition of the Mahabharata, in which the twenty-line story is relegated to a footnote in an appendix. The story of Ganesha acting as the scribe occurs in 37 of the 59 manuscripts consulted during the preparation of the critical edition. Ganesha's association with mental agility and learning is one reason he is shown as scribe for 's dictation of the Mahabharata in this interpolation. Richard L. Brown dates the story to the 8th century, and Moriz Winternitz concludes that it was known as early as c. 900, but it was not added to the Mahabharata some 150 years later. Winternitz also notes that a distinctive feature in South Indian manuscripts of the Mahabharata is their omission of this Ganesha legend.

Puranic period 

Stories about Ganesha often occur in the Puranic corpus. Brown notes while the Puranas "defy precise chronological ordering", the more detailed narratives of Ganesha's life are in the late texts, c. 600–1300. Yuvraj Krishan says that the Puranic myths about the birth of Ganesha and how he acquired an elephant's head are in the later Puranas, which were composed of c. 600 onwards. He elaborates on the matter to say that references to Ganesha in the earlier Puranas, such as the Vayu and Brahmanda Puranas, are later interpolations made during the 7th to 10th centuries.

In his survey of Ganesha's rise to prominence in Sanskrit literature, Ludo Rocher notes that:

Ganesha's rise to prominence was codified in the 9th century when he was formally included as one of the five primary deities of Smartism. The 9th-century philosopher Adi Shankara popularised the "worship of the five forms" (Panchayatana puja) system among orthodox Brahmins of the Smarta tradition. This worship practice invokes the five deities Ganesha, Vishnu, Shiva, Devi, and Surya. Adi Shankara instituted the tradition primarily to unite the principal deities of these five major sects on an equal status. This formalised the role of Ganesha as a complementary deity.

Scriptures 

Once Ganesha was accepted as one of the five principal deities of Hinduism, some Hindus chose Ganesha as their principal deity. They developed the Ganapatya tradition, as seen in the Ganesha Purana and the Mudgala Purana.

The date of composition for the Ganesha Purana and the Mudgala Purana—and their dating relative to one another—has sparked academic debate. Both works were developed over time and contain age-layered strata. Anita Thapan reviews comment about dating and provide her own judgment. "It seems likely that the core of the Ganesha Purana appeared around the twelfth and thirteenth centuries", she says, "but was later interpolated." Lawrence W. Preston considers the most reasonable date for the Ganesha Purana to be between 1100 and 1400, which coincides with the apparent age of the sacred sites mentioned by the text.

R.C. Hazra suggests that the Mudgala Purana is older than the Ganesha Purana, which he dates between 1100 and 1400. However, Phyllis Granoff finds problems with this relative dating and concludes that the Mudgala Purana was the last of the philosophical texts concerned with Ganesha. She bases her reasoning on the fact that, among other internal evidence, the Mudgala Purana specifically mentions the Ganesha Purana as one of the four Puranas (the Brahma, the Brahmanda, the Ganesha, and the Mudgala Puranas) which deal at length with Ganesha. While the kernel of the text must be old, it was interpolated until the 17th and 18th centuries as the worship of Ganapati became more important in certain regions. Another highly regarded scripture in the Ganapatya tradition, the Sanskrit Ganapati Atharvashirsa, was probably composed during the 16th or 17th century.

The Ganesha Sahasranama is part of the Puranic literature, and is a litany of a thousand names and attributes of Ganesha. Each name in the sahasranama conveys a different meaning and symbolises a different aspect of Ganesha. Versions of the Ganesha Sahasranama are found in the Ganesha Purana.

Beyond India and Hinduism 

Commercial and cultural contacts extended India's influence in Western and Southeast Asia. Ganesha is one of a number of Hindu deities who consequently reached foreign lands.

Ganesha was particularly worshipped by traders and merchants, who went out of India for commercial ventures. From approximately the 10th century onwards, new networks of exchange developed including the formation of trade guilds and a resurgence of money circulation. During this time, Ganesha became the principal deity associated with traders. The earliest inscription invoking Ganesha before any other deity is associated with the merchant community.

Hindus migrated to Maritime Southeast Asia and took their culture, including Ganesha, with them. Statues of Ganesha are found throughout the region, often beside Shiva sanctuaries. The forms of Ganesha found in the Hindu art of Philippines, Java, Bali, and Borneo show specific regional influences. The spread of Hindu culture throughout Southeast Asia established Ganesha worship in modified forms in Burma, Cambodia, and Thailand. In Indochina, Hinduism and Buddhism were practised side by side, and mutual influences can be seen in the iconography of Ganesha in the region. In Thailand, Cambodia, and among the Hindu classes of the Chams in Vietnam, Ganesha was mainly thought of as a remover of obstacles.

Among the Indonesian, who predominantly profess Muslim faith, Ganesha is not worshipped, but seen as a symbol of knowledge, wisdom and education. Many Indonesian public universities feature Ganesha's likeness in their grounds or logo. Blitar, Salatiga City, and Kediri Regency are among three local governments that include Ganesha in their regency/city official seals. Indonesia is the only country who featured Ganesha on her bill (20 thousand denomination, between 1998 and 2008), although it is no longer in circulation.

Today in Buddhist Thailand, Ganesha is regarded as a remover of obstacles, the god of success. Thailand regards Ganesha mainly as the god of arts and academics. The belief was initiated by King Vajiravudh of the Chakri dynasty who was devoted to Ganesha personally. He even built a Ganesha shrine at his personal palace, Sanam Chandra Palace in Nakhon Pathom Province where he focused on his academic and literature works. His personal belief regarding Ganesha as the god of arts formally became prominent following the establishment of the Fine Arts Department where he took Ganesha as the seal. Today, Ganesha is depicted both in the seal of the Fine Arts Department, and Thailand's first prominent fine arts academy; the Silpakorn University.

Before the arrival of Islam, Afghanistan had close cultural ties with India, and the adoration of both Hindu and Buddhist deities was practised. Examples of sculptures from the 5th to the 7th centuries have survived, suggesting that the worship of Ganesha was then in vogue in the region.

Ganesha appears in Mahayana Buddhism, not only in the form of the Buddhist god , but also as a Hindu demon form with the same name. His image appears in Buddhist sculptures during the late Gupta period. As the Buddhist god , he is often shown dancing. This form, called  Ganapati, was popular in northern India, later adopted in Nepal, and then in Tibet. In Nepal, the Hindu form of Ganesha, known as Heramba, is popular; he has five heads and rides a lion. Tibetan representations of Ganesha show ambivalent views of him. A Tibetan rendering of Ganapati is tshogs bdag. Other depictions show him as the Destroyer of Obstacles, and sometimes dancing. Ganesha appears in China and Japan in forms that show distinct regional character. In northern China, the earliest known stone statue of Ganesha carries an inscription dated to 531. In Japan, where Ganesha is known as Kangiten, the Ganesha cult was first mentioned in 806.

The canonical literature of Jainism does not mention the worship of Ganesha. However, Ganesha is worshipped by some Jains, for whom he appears to have taken over certain functions of the god of wealth, Kubera. Jain ties with the trading community support the idea that Jainism took up Ganesha worship as a result of commercial connections and influence of Hinduism. The earliest known Jain Ganesha statue dates to about the 9th century. A 15th-century Jain text lists procedures for the installation of its images. Images of Ganesha appear in some Jain temples of Rajasthan and Gujarat.

See also
 Gajasura
 Cultural depictions of elephants

Explanatory notes

Citations

General references 

 
 
  Four volumes.
 
 
 
 .
 
 
 
 
 
 
 
 
 
 

 .
 
 
 . Source text with a commentary by Bhāskararāya in Sanskrit.

External links 
 Ganesh: Symbol and presence

 
Animal gods
Arts gods
Creator gods
Buddhist gods
Commerce gods
Elephants in Indian culture
Abundance gods
Fortune gods
Heavenly attendants in Jainism
Hindu gods
Knowledge gods
Mythological human hybrids
Wisdom gods
Names of God in Sikhism
Hindu given names
Names of God in Hinduism
Buddhism and Hinduism
Elephants in Hinduism
Elephants in Buddhism